The Wadi Rum Consultancy of Wadi Rum Organic Farms, is an example of desert greening. Begun in 2010, it is located in historic Wadi Rum, in southern Jordan. Overseen by permaculture expert Geoff Lawton, it has established a sustainable agriculture system.

Overview 
The program has achieved success, primarily, by implementing principles of hydrological and permacultural design. The results of the consultancy have been documented in photographs, as well as in several videos.

See also
Al Baydha Project
Sahara Forest Project

References

2010 establishments in Jordan
Agriculture in Jordan
Aqaba Governorate
Nature conservation in Jordan
Conservation projects
Desert greening
Ecological restoration
Land reclamation
Organic farming in Asia
Permaculture organizations
Projects established in 2010
Rural community development
Science and technology in Jordan
Sustainable agriculture
Water conservation
Water and the environment
Water in Jordan
Water scarcity
Water supply and sanitation in Jordan